Smasher may refer to:

 Smasher, nickname of Art Shamsky (born 1941), American Major League Baseball outfielder and Israel Baseball League manager
Smasher (Marvel Comics)
Smasher (Image Comics)
The Smasher, a comic strip character
Smasher Sloan, a former professional wrestler
Atom Zombie Smasher, a 2011 video game

See also 
 Smash (disambiguation)